The Lower Saxony Order of Merit is a civil order of merit,  of the German State of Lower Saxony.  The order was established 27 March 1961.   The order is presented in three classes, the highest is the Grand Cross of Merit (Großes Verdienstkreuz), the next is the Cross of Merit First Class (Verdienstkreuz 1. Klasse), and the lowest is the Cross of Merit on Ribbon (Verdienstkreuz am Bande).

References

Lower Saxony
Lower Saxony
Culture of Lower Saxony